Terfluranol (INN, BAN) (developmental code name BX-428) is a synthetic, nonsteroidal estrogen of the stilbestrol group related to diethylstilbestrol that was developed for the treatment of breast cancer but was never marketed. It was described in the medical literature in 1974.

See also
 Acefluranol
 Bifluranol
 Pentafluranol

References

Organofluorides
Phenols
Synthetic estrogens
Trifluoromethyl compounds